Stary Yurmash (İśke Yurmaş) is a rural locality (a selo) in Turbaslinsky Selsoviet, Iglinsky District, Bashkortostan, Russia. The population was 127 as of 2010. There is 1 street.

Geography 
Stary Yurmash is located 31 km southwest of Iglino (the district's administrative centre) by road. Turbasly is the nearest rural locality.

References 

Rural localities in Iglinsky District